VBG Verkehrsbetriebe Glattal AG operates local public transport in the Glattal and Furttal regions and in the Effretikon/Volketswil area in the north-east of Zürich on behalf of the Zürcher Verkehrsverbund. As a purely market-responsible company, VBG has been responsible exclusively for the planning and implementation of transport services since 1993. All transport services are provided by contractors who organise driving personnel and vehicles.

In 2019, the VBG transport network consisted of 54 lines (bus 52, tram 2) with a route length of 285.0 km (bus 272.3 km, tram 12.7 km). 39 million passengers were transported. VBG is the owner of the infrastructure of Glattalbahn and uses also the Glattalbus name.

References

External links

VBG

Government-owned companies of Switzerland
Transport in the canton of Zürich